Gert Toni Wilkens (born 18 June 1962 in Husby-Ärlinghundra, Uppland, Sweden) is a Swedish actor. Besides acting he is director of Improvia Interactive AB, a company who help companies with developing by theatre.

Selected filmography
1990: Gränslots
1994: Sixten
1995: Tre Kronor (TV series)
1996: Kalle Blomkvist – Mästerdetektiven lever farligt
2000: Jönssonligan spelar högt
2003: Norrmalmstorg (TV film)

Sources

External links
http://www.sfi.se/sv/svensk-filmdatabas/Item/?type=PERSON&itemid=203599

Swedish male actors
1962 births
Living people